Austin Berry may refer to:

 Austin Berry (footballer) (born 1971), retired Costa Rican footballer
 Austin Berry (soccer) (born 1988), retired American soccer player